Emily Kaldwin is a fictional character of the Dishonored series. She is a lead protagonist in the sequel, Dishonored 2. In the story of the first game, she is the daughter of the Empress and the player-character, Corvo. When the Empress is assassinated and Emily kidnapped, the player recovers Emily whereupon she serves as a moral compass by expressing herself differently based on the player's proclivity for violence in their gameplay choices. Emily reigns for 15 years leading up to the sequel's story, when she is usurped and escapes to plot her revenge. The developers noted Emily and her relationship with the player as one of the most compelling elements they took to the sequel. Her announcement as its protagonist was unveiled as a surprise and welcomed by games journalists as emblematic of progress for female representation in video games, leading an industry trend towards more prevalent lead female protagonists at the 2015 Electronic Entertainment Expo.

Character design 
In the story of the first Dishonored game, Emily is the ten-year-old daughter of the Empress Jessamine Kaldwin and her bodyguard, Corvo Attano. At the outset of the game, the Empress is assassinated and Emily kidnapped. The player, as Corvo, becomes an assassin and seeks revenge against those who framed him for the Empress's murder. After the player rescues Emily, she serves as a gauge for the moral choices the player makes throughout the game. Her interactions toward the player change in proportion to the player's inclination towards violence in their in-game choices.

The sequel is set 15 years after the first, as an interloper arrives to usurp Emily's throne. In those 15 years, the game's story tells how Emily, now 25 years old, was responsible for marginal improvements in quality of life, corruption, and freedom, how she hosted an annual commemoration of her mother's death, and how she trains with Corvo to prepare herself for an attempt on her own life. More immediately relevant to the game's plot was Emily's decree on an important in-game resource whale oil, for which she ordered rationing, a move that led to a steep increase in the resource's price. This decree was met with outspoken outcry from some of the Empire's elite and set the stage for the coup that kicks off the events of the game.

The player can play as either Emily or Corvo in the sequel, though the selection cannot be changed mid-game. Each player-character has unique abilities and a common mission sequence. In comparison to Corvo's, Emily's move set has more momentum, as her teleport ability has physics like a rope swing. Her telling of the game's story is also different from Corvo's, mainly deriving from their differences in age and social position:"Corvo's an older guy, he's coming home for the first time to Serkonos. Emily is like an empress outlaw on the run, and she's young, she's 25. So their perspectives are very different".Emily's powers are similarly intended to reflect her character. Most powers, such as Domino and Mesmerize, recall her role as Empress. Shadow Walk meanwhile reflects "a moment of darkness" in her life, the murder of her mother and her own kidnapping in the first Dishonored.

Emily's character is voiced in the original by Chloë Grace Moretz, who also portrayed Hit Girl in Kick Ass. In the sequel, Emily is voiced by Erica Luttrell, who also portrayed Keesha Franklin of The Magic School Bus, Darla of Fallout 4, and Sapphire of Steven Universe. Luttrell admits to having a love of super-heroines, and described voicing Emily as "as close to [a superheroine] as I've probably played".

Development 
The developers were particularly interested in how Emily would handle choices in her adult life after being interrupted from her life of privilege. Harvey Smith, the game's co-director, said that the team worked particularly hard to avoid common female protagonist tropes. Emily's story drove the development of the game. Arkane Studio co-founder and Dishonored 2 co-director Raphael Colantonio said that her character was the main element worth salvaging from the original, and she became "an anchor" to the fictional world. Smith added that the player response to Emily's original appearance encouraged the development team to continue her story. For instance, Smith noted how players told stories of changing their style of play after noticing that Emily, as a child, changed the tone of her drawings in response to the players' in-game decisions. In the sequel's announcement trailer, the gender identity of the protagonist, as Emily, was left as a surprise twist.

Reception 
Journalists from The Guardian and GameSpot wrote that Emily, as a lead female character, was part of an industry-wide trend noted during the 2015 Electronic Entertainment Expo for developers to feature more female lead characters. In their recaps of the industry exposition, Game Informer included Emily among its list of the most promising new characters and GamesRadar said that Emily's reveal as the game's protagonist was among its biggest surprises. Journalists noted her reveal as progress for the industry, especially as the change was made without self-congratulation. Jess Joho (Kill Screen) wrote that Emily would have to be detached from the player's emotional motivations, with her own play style and as her own entity, in order for the sequel to escape the trend of fatherlike protectorship narratives in video games. Joho appreciated the game's direction, based on preview information. Before the expo, GamesRadar argued that Emily was worthy of her own game, based on the story of her training in the original game and the website's thoughts on how the moral decisions of the first game could affect the story of the sequel. Tropes vs. Women Anita Sarkeesian claim that women characters fit narrow roles in Arkane Studios's 2012 game Dishonored initially made the studio defensive, but led the team to realize that the game's female characters were solely servants, prostitutes, witches, queens, girls, or mistresses, though this was not their intention. As a result, the development team decided to expand Emily Kaldwin's role as a playable main character in Dishonored 2.

See also 
 Empress regnant

References

Further reading 

Action-adventure game characters
Fictional assassins in video games
Bethesda characters
Child characters in video games
Dishonored (series)
Emperor and empress characters in video games
Female characters in video games
Microsoft protagonists
Princess characters in video games
Shapeshifter characters in video games
Video game characters introduced in 2012
Fictional swordfighters in video games
Fictional characters who can duplicate themselves
Video game characters who have mental powers
Video game characters who use magic
Fictional bisexual females
LGBT characters in video games
Woman soldier and warrior characters in video games